van den Hove is a Dutch surname. Notable people with the surname include:

Joachim van den Hove (1567?–1620), Flemish composer
Martin van den Hove (1605–1639), Dutch astronomer and mathematician

Surnames of Dutch origin